Altınova, historically Toplamalar, is a village in the Nurdağı District, Gaziantep Province, Turkey. The village is populated by Kurds of the Çelikan tribe and had a population of 294 in 2022.

References

Villages in Nurdağı District
Kurdish settlements in Gaziantep Province